The constricted elimia, scientific name †Elimia impressa, was a species of freshwater snail with a gill and an operculum, an aquatic gastropod mollusk in the family Pleuroceridae. This species was endemic to the United States.

References

Elimia
Extinct gastropods
Gastropods described in 1841
Taxonomy articles created by Polbot
Taxa named by Isaac Lea